Kongsgård (Swedish:Kungsgård) is a residence, estate, or farmland that has belonged to or still belongs to the Scandinavian monarchs or royal families.

History 

During the Viking Age and early Middle Ages, the nations of Scandinavia were organized as frail political unions, a system which often led to conflicts and internal turmoil. To remain in control, the Scandinavian kings would frequently travel throughout their kingdoms to keep oversight.  Kongsgård  would then function as temporary residencies for the kings and were often fortified and gradually developed into larger main estates. Throughout the late Middle Ages, many royal estates were re-enforced with castles. Over time, the kings were able to unify their countries and consolidate their power, ruling instead from a single seat or capital.

Norwegian Kongsgård estates 
The first King of Norway, King Harald Fairhair, ordered his earls and their hersir to construct estates and farms along the Norwegian coast that would belong to the king and the hird. King Harald would establish the significant Kongsgård estate Alrekstad in Bergen which functioned as his seat of power.
In the Middle Ages, King Eystein I of Norway would  relocated Alrekstad estate in Bergen, building a new fortified palace where Bergenhus fortress is presently located.

Other Kongsgård estates includes: 
Oslo Kongsgård estate
Avaldsnes Kongsgård estate
 Kongsgård estate at Fitjar
 Kongsgård estate at Seim, Hordaland
Værne Kloster 
Utstein Abbey

Danish Kongsgård estates 
Corselitze
Børglum Abbey

Swedish Kongsgård estates 
Husby (estate)
Karlberg Palace
Kaknäs
Uppsala öd

Faroese Kongsgård estates 
Kirkjubøargarður at Kirkjubøur

See also 
Kaiserpfalz

References 

Royal residences in Norway
Viking Age populated places
Medieval Norway
Palaces in Norway
Castles in Denmark
Danish monarchy
Swedish monarchy
Castles in Stockholm County
Royal residences in Denmark
Royal residences in Sweden